The 2014 AFF U19 Youth Championship or AFF U-19 Nutifood Cup 2014 held from 5 September to 13 September 2014, hosted by Vietnam. 5 members of the ASEAN Football Federation have registered to take part in the competition, these being hosts Vietnam, Thailand, Indonesia, Australia and Myanmar. Japan have also accepted an invitation to take part.

This is the 5th time that Vietnam was host the championship with all matches set to take place in the Mỹ Đình National Stadium, Hanoi, in Northern Vietnam. Previous editions hosted by Vietnam have all been played in Ho Chi Minh City in the South of the country.

Teams 
The following teams competed in the tournament as preparation for the 2014 AFC U-19 Championship that was played a month later. Japan are an invited team from outside the region. Two groups of three sides were drawn in early June.

  (invited)
 
  (Invited)
 
 
  (Host)

Venues

Standings and results 
All times are local (UTC+07:00)

Group A

Group B

Knockout stage

Semi-finals

Third place play-off

Final

Winner

Goalscorers 
3 goals

  Masaya Okugawa
  Sittichok Kannoo

2 goals

  Masaomi Nakano
  Maung Maung Soe
  Aung Thu
  Atthawit Sukchuai
  Patiphan Pinsermsootsri
  Nguyễn Công Phượng
  Nguyễn Văn Toàn

1 goal

  Harry Ascroft
  Peter Skapetis
  Scott Galloway
  Al-Qomar Tehupelasury
  Martinus Novianto Ardhi
  Yōsuke Ideguchi
  Shota Kaneko
  Yamato Ochi
  Genta Omotehara
  Daisuke Takagi
  Htike Htike Aung
  Nyein Chan Aung
  Piyapong Homkhajohn
  Nopphon Phonkham
  Nguyễn Tuấn Anh
  Lương Xuân Trường
  Phan Văn Long

References

External links 
  

3
2014
Aff U-20 Youth Championship, 2014
2014
2014 in youth association football